Georgia Wilson (born 1 February 2002) is an English footballer who plays for AaB in the Danish Elitedivisionen.

Playing career

Bristol City
On 15 September 2019 Wilson made her senior debut for Bristol City in a 2–0 defeat away to Everton. She scored her first goal for the club on 11 December 2019 in a 5–2 win over Charlton Athletic in the League Cup. Wilson left at the end of the 2020-21 FAWSL season.

Career statistics

Club
As of 3 February 2020.

References

External links
 
 Bristol City profile
 

Living people
Bristol City W.F.C. players
2002 births
English women's footballers
Women's Super League players
Women's association football midfielders